Luis Patricio Mardones Díaz (born 17 July 1962), known as Patricio Mardones, is a former Chilean football midfielder.

Playing career
Mardones is a historical player of the traditional rivals Universidad Católica and Universidad de Chile, since he won 2 national leagues along with each team.

He played for the Chile national football team and was capped 29 times scoring 2 goal between 1985 and 1995. Mardones made his debut on 8 February 1985 in a friendly against Finland.

Coaching career
He worked for Universidad de Chile as the coach of youth ranks (1997–2001) and the assistant coach of the first team (2001–2003).

In addition, from 2016 to 2017 he performed as Director of Azul Azul, the public limited company that manages Universidad de Chile. Next, he switched to Head of Recruitment for the youth ranks until 2020.

Honours

Club
Universidad Católica
 Copa Polla Gol (1): 1983
 Copa de la Reoública (1): 1983
 Primera División (2): 1984, 1987

Universidad de Chile
 Primera División (2): 1994, 1995

References

External links

Patricio Mardones at PartidosdelaRoja (in Spanish) 
Patricio Mardones at PlaymakerStats

1962 births
Living people
People from Cachapoal Province
Chilean footballers
Chilean expatriate footballers
Chile international footballers
1987 Copa América players
1995 Copa América players
Chilean Primera División players
Universidad de Chile footballers
Club Deportivo Universidad Católica footballers
O'Higgins F.C. footballers
Swiss Super League players
FC St. Gallen players
Chilean expatriate sportspeople in Switzerland
Expatriate footballers in Switzerland
Association football midfielders
Chilean football managers